Dynamite the Dog was a canine actor who starred in several Universal films in the late 1920s and early 1930s. According to some reports, he was a police dog. It is unknown what became of him after his last credited role in 1930's The Indians Are Coming.

Selected filmography 

 Wolf's Trail (1927)
 Fangs of Destiny (1927)
 The Call of the Heart (1928)
 The Four-Footed Ranger (1928)
 The Hound of Silver Creek (1928)
 The Indians Are Coming (1930)

References

External links

Dog actors